Matti Kärki, (born 13 December 1972) is a Swedish singer who is best known for his work with Dismember. Before he joined Dismember in 1991, he was the singer in the Swedish band Carnage (1989-1990). The first band fronted by Kärki was Therion in 1989. He also appears with the Autopsy-inspired Murder Squad since 1993. Furthermore, he was part of the experimental band Carbonized from 1988 to 1990. Kärki appeared as a guest-singer of Entombed and sang "But Life Goes On" on the Entombed show in Sala on 24 June 1990. Moreover, he was the bass player for General Surgery during 1988 to 1990, and joined again in early 2000 when the band was temporarily resurrected to record a song for the Carcass tribute album Requiems of Revulsion.

References

1972 births
Swedish heavy metal singers
Swedish male singers
Therion (band) members
Living people
Dismember (band) members
Carbonized members
Carnage (band) members
Murder Squad members
Entombed (band) members
Swedish people of Finnish descent